Kiefferulus is a genus of European non-biting midges in the subfamily Chironominae of the bloodworm family Chironomidae.

Species
K. dux (Johannsen, 1905)
K. tendipediformis (Goetghebuer, 1921)

References

Chironomidae
Diptera of Europe